The Landseer is a dog that originated in Canada. It is a black-and-white variety of the Newfoundland that is recognised as an independent breed in continental Europe.

History
The Newfoundland (and Landseer) are descended from dogs used by fishermen in the Newfoundland and Labrador region of Canada. It is believed these dogs are descended from water dogs and livestock guardian dogs imported by Portuguese and Basque fishing vessels. In the Victorian era black-and-white Newfoundland dogs were more popular than the solid black coloration, and they were the subject of a number of 19th-century artists including Sydenham Edwards, Philip Reinagle, Samuel Jones, and most famously Edwin Landseer, whose name was used to describe black-and-white Newfoundlands as early as 1896.

In the 20th century the solid black coloration became more popular and supplanted the bi-colored animals, so much so that in the 1930s a concerted effort was made to recreate the dogs seen in the paintings of Landseer. The efforts of these breeders resulted in the Landseer breed. In Great Britain and North America Landseer colored dogs are considered a variety of the Newfoundland breed, but in 1960 a separate breed club for Landseer-colored dogs was created in Germany. Similar clubs soon followed in Belgium and Holland, and they are now considered a separate breed in continental Europe with separate Fédération Cynologique Internationale recognition.

Genetics
The Landseer's black and white coloration arises from the recessive piebald color allele found in Newfoundlands; the piebald coloration is a recessive trait so a single litter can have both Landseer and solid-colored puppies, depending on the genotype of the parents. With this split in recognition gradual differences in appearance began to appear between the two forms: the European form is taller with longer legs and less bulk, and a longer, more tapered head – its coat is said to be curlier whilst the Newfoundland's is said to be wavier.

A study in 2015 found a special gene in Landseers with muscular dystrophy, called COL6A1. The affected dogs represent a closer animal model for human Ullrich congenital muscular dystrophy than that previously created in mice.

See also
 Dogs portal
 List of dog breeds

References

Dog breeds originating in Canada
FCI breeds